Chris Banning is an American politician who has served as the Oklahoma House of Representatives member from the 24th district since November 16, 2022.

Career
Banning joined the United States Air Force in 1993 as an Airman Basic. He participated in Operation Provide Comfort between December 13, 1993, and January 12, 1997. He also provided volunteer relief at Tinker Air Force Base during the Oklahoma City bombing.

Banning is the CEO of Banning Investment Group.

Oklahoma House of Representatives
Banning challenged incumbent Representative Logan Phillips in the 2022 Republican primary, along with another candidate, Bobby Schultz. Banning was endorsed by Governor Kevin Stitt and Americans for Prosperity. Banning won the June Republican primary. Since no non-Republican candidate filled, there was no November general election. He was sworn in November 16, 2022.

Personal life
Banning and his wife, Katy, have six children. He and his family live in Bixby, Oklahoma.

References

External links
Ballotpedia

Year of birth missing (living people)
1970s births
Living people
21st-century American politicians
Republican Party members of the Oklahoma House of Representatives
United States Air Force airmen